University Athletic Association of the Philippines track and field athletics champions since 1938.

UAAP track and field champions

^FEU was crowned as the official champion for the UAAP Season 81 Women's Track and Field during the closing ceremonies of the UAAP Season 81 last May 21, 2019

Number of championships per university

* Withdrew from the UAAP.

Streaks
Ateneo owns the longest Juniors Championship streak with 19. (coached first by Benjamin Silva-Netto followed by Edward Sediego)
FEU owns the longest Women's Championship streak with 11.
FEU and UE share the longest Men's Championship streak with 8.

See also
NCAA Philippines Track and Field Championship

References

STO TOMAS, UE, ATENEO JRS TOP UAAP ATHLETICS; TIGERS HURT EVEN MORE

Track and field
National athletics competitions
Recurring sporting events established in 1938
Athletics in Asia